Davis Paul (born October 12, 1988 in San Diego, California) is an American professional soccer player who last played for the Chicago Fire in Major League Soccer.

Career

College and amateur
Paul attended Damien High School.

Paul played college soccer at the University of California, Berkeley, where he scored 18 goals and 21 assists in 75 appearances for the team. Entering UCB, Paul was selected by College Soccer News to the "100 Freshmen From Coast To Coast To Keep An Eye On". The 2010 Bears set the school's single-season assist record of 49 thanks in large part to Paul, an NSCAA All-American as well as All-Pac-10/NSCAA Regional First-Team selection. The Upland, California forward concluded his senior season as Cal's all-time single-season assist record holder with 15. Paul ranks fourth on Cal's career assist list with 22 and scored 30 points (13th nationally) in his final season, tying Carr for sixth place on the school's single-season points list. Paul led the Bears with career highs in goals (9), assists, points and game-winning goals (6) in 2010. During the regular season, he led the Pac-10 in points (28), goals (8) assists (13) and game-winners (4). Along with many other accolades including Athlete of the Year at UC Berkeley, he claimed four Pac-10 Player of the Week honors as well.

During his college years, Paul also played one season with the Los Angeles Legends in the USL Premier Development League, scoring 10 goals and notching 5 assists in 12 games.

Professional
On January 14, 2011, Paul was drafted #51 overall in the 2011 MLS SuperDraft by the Chicago Fire. He made his professional debut on March 30, 2011, starting in a Lamar Hunt US Open Cup game against the Colorado Rapids, and made his MLS debut on April 17 against Los Angeles Galaxy.

Paul was waived by Chicago  and was subsequently re-signed by Chicago to their U23 team where he played until the end of the season. He had short stints with Sporting Kansas City and the Seattle Sounders  before heading overseas to Norway to play with Stromgodset.

Upon return, he played in the Lamar Hunt Open Cup with CSL Team, PSA Elite, where he helped the team advance to the round of 16 with two goals over the Portland Timbers

References

External links
 
 UCB profile

1988 births
Living people
American soccer players
California Golden Bears men's soccer players
LA Laguna FC players
Chicago Fire FC players
Chicago Fire U-23 players
USL League Two players
Major League Soccer players
People from Upland, California
Chicago Fire FC draft picks
Soccer players from California
Association football midfielders